Grevillea australis, commonly known as alpine grevillea or southern grevillea, is a species of flowering plant in the family Proteaceae and is endemic to south-eastern Australia. It is a spreading to prostrate shrub with simple, narrowly egg-shaped leaves and groups of white to pale pink flowers with a glabrous ovary.

Description
Flowering mostly occurs from December to February and the fruit is a glabrous follicle.

Taxonomy
Grevillea australis was first formally described in 1810 by Robert Brown in Transactions of the Linnean Society of London. The specific epithet (australis) means "southern".

Distribution and habitat
Alpine grevillea grows heath and woodland, usually in moist, rocky places in mountain and alpine areas south from the Brindabella Range in the Australian Capital Territory, through southern New South Wales to Mount Buller and Mount Baw Baw in Victoria. It is also common in Tasmania, especially on the Central Plateau, and is the only grevillea species in that state.

Use in horticulture
Grevillea australis grows best in cool to cold climates. It grows best in sunny locations in well-drained soil.

References

australis
Flora of New South Wales
Flora of Tasmania
Flora of Victoria (Australia)
Proteales of Australia
Plants described in 1810
Taxa named by Robert Brown (botanist, born 1773)